Felt is a textile material that is produced by matting, condensing and pressing fibers together. Felt can be made of natural fibers such as wool or animal fur, or from synthetic fibers such as petroleum-based acrylic or acrylonitrile or wood pulp–based rayon. Blended fibers are also common. Natural fibre felt has special properties that allow it to be used for a wide variety of purposes. "It is fire-retardant and self-extinguishing; it dampens vibration and absorbs sound; and it can hold large amounts of fluid without feeling wet..."

History

Felt from wool is one of the oldest known textiles. Many cultures have legends as to the origins of felt making. Sumerian legend claims that the secret of feltmaking was discovered by Urnamman of Lagash. The story of Saint Clement and Saint Christopher relates that the men packed their sandals with wool to prevent blisters while fleeing from persecution. At the end of their journey, the movement and sweat had turned the wool into felt socks.

Most likely felt's origins can be found in central Asia, where there is evidence of feltmaking in Siberia (Altai mountains) in Northern Mongolia and more recently evidence dating back to the first century AD in Mongolia. Siberian tombs (7th to 2nd century BC) show the broad uses of felt in that culture, including clothing, jewelry, wall hangings, and elaborate horse blankets. Employing careful color use, stitching, and other techniques, these feltmakers were able to use felt as an illustrative and decorative medium on which they could depict abstract designs and realistic scenes with great skill. Over time these makers became known for the beautiful abstract patterns they used that were derived from plant, animal, and other symbolic designs.

From Siberia and Mongolia, feltmaking spread across the areas held by the Turkic-Mongolian tribes. Sheep and camel herds were central to the wealth and lifestyle of these tribes, both of which were critical to producing the fibers needed for felting. As nomads traveling frequently and living on fairly treeless plains, felt provided housing (yurts, tents, etc.), insulation, floor coverings, and inside walling, as well as many household necessities from bedding and coverings to clothing. In nomadic peoples, an area where feltmaking was particularly visible was in trappings for their animals and for travel. Felt was often featured in the blankets that went under saddles.

Dyes provided rich coloring, and colored slices of pre-felts (semi-felted sheets that could be cut in decorative ways), along with dyed yarns and threads were combined to create beautiful designs on the wool backgrounds. Felt was even used to create totems and amulets with protective functions. In traditional societies, the patterns embedded in the felt were also imbued with significant religious and symbolic meaning.

Feltmaking is still practised by nomadic peoples (such as Mongols and Turkic people) in Central Asia, where rugs, tents and clothing are regularly made. Some of these are traditional items, such as the classic yurt (Gers), while others are designed for the tourist market, such as decorated slippers. In the Western world, felt is widely used as a medium for expression in both textile art and contemporary art and design, where it has significance as an ecologically responsible textile and building material.

In addition to Central Asian traditions of felting, Scandinavian countries have also supported feltmaking, particularly for clothing.

Manufacturing methods

Wet felting

In the wet felting process, hot water is applied to layers of animal hairs, while repeated agitation and compression causes the fibers to hook together or weave together into a single piece of fabric. Wrapping the properly arranged fiber in a sturdy, textured material, such as a bamboo mat or burlap, will speed up the felting process. The felted material may be finished by fulling.

Only certain types of fiber can be wet felted successfully. Most types of fleece, such as those taken from the alpaca or the Merino sheep, can be put through the wet felting process. One may also use mohair (goat), angora (rabbit), or hair from rodents such as beavers and muskrats. These types of fiber are covered in tiny scales, similar to the scales found on a strand of human hair. Heat, motion, and moisture of the fleece causes the scales to open, while agitating them causes them to latch onto each other, creating felt. There is an alternative theory that the fibers wind around each other during felting. Plant fibers and synthetic fibers will not wet felt.

In order to make multi-colored designs, felters conduct a two-step process in which they create pre-felts of specialized colors—these semi-completed sheets of colored felt can then be cut with a sharp implement (knife or scissors) and the distinctive colors placed next to each other as in making a mosaic. The felting process is then resumed and the edges of the fabric attach to each other as the felting process is completed. Shrdak carpets (Turkmenistan) use a form of this method wherein two pieces of contrasting color are cut out with the same pattern, the cut-outs are then switched, fitting one into the other, which makes a sharply defined and colorful patterned piece. In order to strengthen the joints of a mosaic style felt, feltmakers often add a backing layer of fleece that is felted along with the other components. Feltmakers can differ in their orientation to this added layer—where some will lay it on top of the design before felting and others will place the design on top of the strengthening layer.

The process of felting was adapted to the lifestyles of the different cultures in which it flourished. In Central Asia, it is common to conduct the rolling/friction process with the aid of a horse, donkey, or camel, which will pull the rolled felt until the process is complete. Alternately, a group of people in a line might roll the felt along, kicking it regularly with their feet. Further fulling can include throwing or slamming and working the edges with careful rolling. In Turkey, some baths had areas dedicated to feltmaking, making use of the steam and hot water that were already present for bathing.

Development of felting as a profession 
As felting grew in importance to a society, so, too, did the knowledge about techniques and approaches. Amateur or community felting obviously continued in many communities at the same time that felting specialists and felting centers began to develop. However, the importance of felting to community life can be seen in the fact that, in many Central Asian communities, felt production is directed by a leader who oversees the process as a ritual that includes prayers—words and actions to bring good luck to the process. Successfully completing the creation of felt (certainly large felt pieces) is reason for celebration, feasting, and the sharing of traditional stories.

In Turkey, craft guilds called "ahi" came into being, and these groups were responsible for registering members and protecting the knowledge of felting. In Istanbul at one time, there were 1,000 felters working in 400 workshops registered in this ahi.

Needle felting

Needle felting is a method of creating felt that uses specially designed needles instead of water. Felting needles have angled notches along the shaft that catch fibers and tangle them together to produce felt. These notches are sometimes erroneously called "barbs", but barbs are protrusions (like barbed wire) and would be too difficult to thrust into the wool and nearly impossible to pull out. Felting needles are thin and sharp, with shafts of a variety of different gauges and shapes. Needle felting is used in industrial felt making as well as for individual art and craft applications.

Felting needles are sometimes fitted in holders that allow the use of 2 or more needles at one time to sculpt wool objects and shapes. Individual needles are often used for detail while multiple needles that are paired together are used for larger areas or to form the base of the project. At any point in time a variety of fibers and fiber colors may be added, using needles to incorporate them into the project.

Needle felting can be used to create both 2 dimensional and 3 dimensional artwork, including soft sculpture, dolls, figurines, jewelry, and 2 dimensional wool paintings. Needle felting is popular with artists and craftspeople worldwide. One example is Ikuyo Fujita（藤田育代 Fujita Ikuyo),  a Japanese artist who works primarily in needle felt painting and mogol (pipe cleaner) art.

Recently, needle-felting machines have become popular for art or craft felters. Similar to a sewing machine, these tools have several needles that punch fibers together. These machines can be used to create felted products more efficiently. The embellishment machine allows the user to create unique combinations of fibers and designs.

Carroting
Invented in the mid 17th century and used until the mid-20th centuries, a process called "carroting" was used in the manufacture of good quality felt for making men's hats. Beaver, rabbit or hare skins were treated with a dilute solution of the mercury compound mercuric nitrate. The skins were dried in an oven where the thin fur at the sides turned orange, the color of carrots. Pelts were stretched over a bar in a cutting machine, and the skin was sliced off in thin shreds, with the fleece coming away entirely. The fur was blown onto a cone-shaped colander and then treated with hot water to consolidate it. The cone then peeled off and passed through wet rollers to cause the fur to felt. These 'hoods' were then dyed and blocked to make hats. The toxic solutions from the carrot and the vapours it produced resulted in widespread cases of mercury poisoning among hatters. This may be the origin of the phrase "mad as a hatter" which was used to humorous effect by Lewis Carroll in the chapter "A Mad Tea Party" of the novel Alice in Wonderland.

Uses

Felt is used in a wide range of industries and manufacturing processes, from the automotive industry and casinos to musical instruments and home construction, as well as in gun wadding, either inside cartridges or pushed down the barrel of a muzzleloader. Felt had many uses in ancient times and continues to be widely used today.

Industrial uses
Felt is frequently used in industry as a sound or vibration damper, as a non-woven fabric for air filtration, and in machinery for cushioning and padding moving parts.

Clothing

During the 18th and 19th centuries gentlemen's headwear made from beaver felt were popular. In the early part of the 20th century, cloth felt hats, such as fedoras, trilbies and homburgs, were worn by many men in the western world. Felt is often used in footwear as boot liners, with the Russian valenki being an example.

Musical instruments
Many musical instruments use felt. It is often used as a damper. On drum cymbal stands, it protects the cymbal from cracking and ensures a clean sound. It is used to wrap bass drum strikers and timpani mallets. Felt is used extensively in pianos; for example, piano hammers are made of wool felt around a wooden core. The density and springiness of the felt is a major part of what creates a piano's tone. As the felt becomes grooved and "packed" with use and age, the tone suffers. Felt is placed under the piano keys on accordions to control touch and key noise; it is also used on the pallets to silence notes not sounded by preventing air flow. Felt is used with other instruments, particularly stringed instruments, as a damper to reduce volume or eliminate unwanted sounds.

Arts and crafts
Felt is used for framing paintings. It is laid between the slip mount and picture as a protective measure to avoid damage from rubbing to the edge of the painting. This is commonly found as a preventive measure on paintings which have already been restored or professionally framed. It is widely used to protect paintings executed on various surfaces including canvas, wood panel and copper plate.

A felt-covered board can be used in storytelling to small children. Small felt cutouts or figures of animals, people, or other objects will adhere to a felt board, and in the process of telling the story, the storyteller also acts it out on the board with the animals or people. Puppets can also be made with felt. The best known example of felt puppets are Jim Henson's Muppets. Felt pressed dolls, such as Lenci dolls, were very popular in the nineteenth century and just after World War I.

As part of the overall renewal of interest in textile and fiber arts, beginning in the 1970s and continuing through today, felt has experienced a strong revival in interest, including its historical roots. Polly Stirling, a fiber artist from New South Wales, Australia, is commonly associated with the development of nuno felting, a key technique for contemporary art felting. German artist Joseph Beuys prominently integrates felt within his works. English artist Jenny Cowern shifted from traditional drawing and painting media into using felt as her primary media.

Modern day felters with access to a broad range of sheep and other animal fibers have exploited knowledge of these different breeds to produce special effects in their felt. Fleece locks are classified by the Bradford or Micron count, both which designate the fineness to coarseness of the material. Fine wools range from 64 to 80 (Bradford); medium 40-60 (Bradford); and coarse 36-60 (Bradford). Merino, the finest and most delicate sheep fleece, will be employed for clothing that goes next to the body. Claudy Jongstra raises traditional and rare breeds of sheep with much hardier coats (Drenthe, Heath, Gotland, Schoonbeek, and Wensleydale) on her property in Friesland and these are used in her interior design projects. Exploitation of these characteristics of the fleece in tandem with the use of other techniques, such as stitching and incorporation of other fibers, provides felters with a broad range of possibilities

See also
 Bowler hat
 Fuzzy felt
 Roofing felt
 Valenki

References

General bibliography
 E. J. W. Barber. Prehistoric Textiles: The Development of Cloth in the Neolithic and Bronze Ages, with Special Reference to the Aegean. Princeton: Princeton University Press, 1991.
 Lise Bender Jørgensen. North European Textiles Until AD 1000. Aarchus: Aarchus University Press, 1992.

External links

Nonwoven fabrics
Building materials
Animal hair products
Fur trade
Maritime culture